I'm Countryfied is the third studio album by Mel McDaniel released in 1980. The album peaked at number 24 on the Top Country Albums charts. The biggest hit on the album, and also one of McDaniel's biggest hits, was "Louisiana Saturday Night," which reached number 7 on the Hot Country Singles & Tracks charts. Also on the US Country charts, the title track, "Countryfied," peaked at number 23, "Hello Daddy Good Morning Darling" peaked at number 39, and "Right in the Palm of Your Hand" peaked at number 10.

Track listing 

 "Louisiana Saturday Night" (Bob McDill) - 2:24
 "If I Keep on Going Crazy" (Roger Murrah, Jim McBride) - 2:38
 "Right in the Palm of Your Hand" (Bob McDill) - 3:12
 "Who's Been Sleeping in My Bed" (Danny Hogan, Frank Newberry) - 3:12
 "Cold Hard Facts of Love" (Mel McDaniel) - 3:05
 "Countryfied" (Ronny Scaife, Danny Hogan) - 2:38
 "Ten Years Three Kids Two Loves Too Late" (Roger Murrah, Jim McBride) - 3:10
 "Goodbye Marie" (Dennis Linde, Mel McDaniel) - 2:56
 "My Ship's Comin' In" (Danny Hogan, Henry Carter, Randy Wilkes) - 3:02
 "Hello Daddy Good Morning Darling" (Roger Murrah, Keith Stegall, Scott Anders) - 3:27

Charts

Weekly charts

Year-end charts

References 

I'm Countryfied at CMT.com

1980 albums
Capitol Records albums
Mel McDaniel albums